Big Mouth may refer to:

Film and television
 Big Mouth (American TV series), an animated television series
 Big Mouth (South Korean TV series), a 2022 South Korean television series
 The Big Mouth, 1967 comedy film starring Jerry Lewis
 Martha Raye (1916–1994), TV and film actress

Music
 "Big Mouth" (Snoop Dogg song), 2017
 "Big Mouth" (Nikki Yanofsky song), 2018
 "Big Mouth", a song by Nikki Lane from the album Highway Queen
 "Big Mouth", a song by Santigold from the album Master of My Make-Believe
 "Big Mouth", a song by Whodini from the album Escape

Other uses
 Big Mouth (chief) (1822–1869), Native American Brulé Sioux leader
 Big Mouth House, publisher
 Big Mouth Billy Bass, animatronic singing toy

See also
 Bigmouth (disambiguation)